The Michael & Susan Dell  Foundation was set up in 1999.  Susan and Michael Dell have supported the foundation primarily through investing the proceeds of sales of shares of Dell Inc. More than (USA) $650 million has been given to children's issues and community initiatives in the United States, India, South Africa  as of 2010. Today the foundation has over $466 million assets under management. According to the OECD, the Michael & Susan Dell Foundation’s financing for 2019 development increased by 11% to US$35 million.

The Michael & Susan Dell Foundation is dedicated to transforming the lives of children living in urban poverty through improving their education, health and family economic stability. It has offices in United States, India and South Africa.

See also
List of wealthiest charitable foundations
MSD Capital
Dell Medical School

References

Medical and health foundations in the United States